Chereas octomaculata is a species of beetle in the family Cerambycidae, and the only species in the genus Chereas. It was described by Buquet in 1857.

References

Calliini
Beetles described in 1857
Monotypic Cerambycidae genera